The 2015 Winston-Salem Open was a men's tennis tournament played on outdoor hard courts. It was the 47th edition of the Winston-Salem Open (as successor to previous tournaments in New Haven and Long Island), and part of the ATP World Tour 250 Series of the 2015 ATP World Tour. It took place at Wake Forest University in Winston-Salem, North Carolina, United States, from August 23 through August 29, 2015. It was the last event on the 2015 US Open Series before the 2015 US Open.

Singles main-draw entrants

Seeds

 Rankings are as of August 17, 2015

Other entrants
The following players received wildcards into the singles main draw:
  Kevin Anderson
  Jared Donaldson
  Tommy Haas
  Gilles Simon

The following players received entry from the qualifying draw:
  Marco Cecchinato
  Pierre-Hugues Herbert
  Martin Kližan
  Frances Tiafoe

Withdrawals
Before the tournament
  Roberto Bautista Agut →replaced by Federico Delbonis
  Víctor Estrella Burgos →replaced by James Duckworth
  David Goffin →replaced by Malek Jaziri
  Marcel Granollers →replaced by James Ward
  Juan Mónaco →replaced by Steve Darcis
  Gilles Müller →replaced by Marsel İlhan
  Albert Ramos Viñolas →replaced by Chung Hyeon

During the tournament
  Lu Yen-hsun

Retirements
  Steve Darcis

Doubles main-draw entrants

Seeds

 Rankings are as of August 17, 2015

Other entrants
The following pairs received wildcards into the doubles main draw:
  Christian Harrison /  Ryan Harrison
  Skander Mansouri /  Christian Seraphim

The following pair received entry as alternates:
  Pablo Andújar /  Marcelo Demoliner

Withdrawals
Before the tournament
  Martin Kližan

Champions

Singles

  Kevin Anderson def.  Pierre-Hugues Herbert, 6–4, 7–5

Doubles

  Dominic Inglot /  Robert Lindstedt def.  Eric Butorac /  Scott Lipsky, 6–2, 6–4

External links
Official website

Winston-Salem Open
Winston-Salem Open
Winston-Salem Open
Winston-Salem Open